Melipona is a genus of stingless bees, widespread in warm areas of the Neotropics, from Sinaloa and Tamaulipas (México) to Tucumán and Misiones (Argentina). About 70 species are known. The largest producer of honey from Melipona bees in Mexico is in the state of Yucatán where bees are studied at an interactive park called "Bee Planet" which is within the Cuxtal Ecological Reserve.

Several species are kept for honey production, such as in Brazil, where some are well-known enough to have common names, including uruçu, mandaçaia, jandaíra, and manduri. Melipona honey has long been used by humans and now is of minor commercial importance. Research is going on in improved beekeeping techniques.

The Melipona bee is the only pollinator known to pollinate the vanilla plant. Pollination by Melipona bee has only occurred in Mexico and almost all vanilla for commercial production is hand pollinated.

Subtaxa 
The following are some proposed subtaxa of Melipona, although they are not yet widely used.

 Eomelipona
 Melikerria
 Melipona (sensu stricto)
 Michmelia

Selected taxa
The genus includes the following species:

 Melipona amazonica (Schulz, 1905)
 Melipona asilvai (Moure, 1971)
 Melipona baeri (Vachal, 1904)
 Melipona beecheii (Bennett, 1831)
 Melipona belizeae (Schwarz, 1932)
 Melipona bicolor (Lepeletier, 1836) – guarupu, guaraipo
 Melipona boliviana (Schwarz, 1932)
 Melipona brachychaeta (Moure, 1950)
 Melipona bradleyi (Schwarz, 1932) (Melipona illustris (Schwarz, 1932))
 Melipona capixaba (Moure & Camargo, 1995)
 Melipona captiosa (Moure, 1962)
 Melipona carrikeri (Cockerell, 1919)
 Melipona colimana (Ayala, 1999)
 Melipona compressipes (Fabricius, 1804) – tiúba
 Melipona compressipes manaosensis – jupará
 Melipona costaricaensis (Cockerell, 1919)
 Melipona cramptoni (Cockerell, 1920)
 Melipona crinita (Moure & Kerr, 1950)
 Melipona dubia (Moure & Kerr, 1950)
 Melipona eburnea (Friese, 1900)
 Melipona fasciata (Latreille, 1811)
 Melipona fasciculata (Smith, 1854)
 Melipona favosa (Fabricius, 1798)
 Melipona fuliginosa (Lepeletier, 1836)
 Melipona flavolineata (Friese, 1900)
 Melipona fulva (Lepeletier, 1836)
 Melipona fuscata (Lepeletier, 1836)
 Melipona fuscopilosa (Moure & Kerr, 1950)
 Melipona fuscipes (Latreille, 1811)
 Melipona grandis (Guérin-Méneville, 1844)
 Melipona illota (Cockerell, 1919)
 Melipona indecisa (Cockerell, 1919)
 Melipona interrupta (Latreille, 1811) – jandaíra
 Melipona lateralis (Erichson, 1848)
 Melipona lupitae (Ayala, 1999)
 Melipona mandacaia (Smith, 1863)
 Melipona marginata (Lepeletier, 1836) – manduri, manduri menor, mandurim, minduri, gurupu-do-miúdo, taipeira
 Melipona melanopleura (Cockerell, 1919)
 Melipona melanoventer (Schwarz, 1932)
 Melipona merrillae (Cockerell, 1919)
 Melipona micheneri (Schwarz, 1951)
 Melipona mimetica (Cockerell, 1914)
 Melipona mondury (Smith, 1863)
 Melipona nebulosa (Camargo, 1988)
 Melipona nigrescens (Friese, 1900)
 Melipona obscurior (Moure, 1971)
 Melipona ogilviei (Schwarz, 1932)
 Melipona orbignyi (Guérin-Méneville, 1844)
 Melipona panamica (Cockerell, 1919)
 Melipona paraensis (Ducke, 1916)
 Melipona peruviana (Friese, 1900)
 Melipona puncticollis (Friese, 1902)
 Melipona quadrifasciata (Lepeletier, 1836) – mandaçaia, amanaçaia, manaçaia, "uruçu"
 M. q. anthidioides
 Melipona quinquefasciata (Lepeletier, 1836) – mandaçaia-da-terra, mandaçaia-do-chão, uruçu-do-chão
 Melipona rufescens (Friese, 1900 )
 Melipona ruficrus – irapuá 
 Melipona rufiventris (Lepeletier, 1836) – uruçu-amarela, tuiuva, tujuba, bugia M. r. paraensis – uruçu-boca-de-ralo
 Melipona salti (Schwarz, 1932)
 Melipona schwarzi (Moure, 1963)
 Melipona scutellaris (Latreille, 1811) – uruçu-nordestina, "uruçu"
 Melipona seminigra (Friese, 1903)
 M. s. atrofulva
 M. s. abunensis
 M. s. merrillae – boca-de-renda
 M. s. pernigra
 Melipona solani (Cockerell, 1912)
 Melipona subnitida (Ducke, 1911) – jandaíra
 Melipona titania (Gribodo, 1893)
 Melipona torrida (Friese, 1917)
 Melipona triplaridis (Cockerell, 1925)
 Melipona tumupasae (Schwarz, 1932)
 Melipona variegatipes (Gribodo, 1893)
 M. v. lautipes
 Melipona yucatanica (Camargo, Moure & Roubik, 1988)

See also
 Stingless bee
 List of stingless bees of Brazil
 Melittology
 Bees and toxic chemicals 
 Trigona, another genus of stingless bees

References

 
Bee genera
Orchid pollinators
Taxa named by Johann Karl Wilhelm Illiger